Zoja Trofimiuk (born 1952) is an Australian sculptor and printmaker, born in Prague, Czechoslovakia. She specializes in cast glass; her studio is in Melbourne.

Education
In 1972, she enrolled at the Academy of Fine Arts in Kraków, Poland. She graduated in 1977 and was awarded a diploma in Fine Art. Trofimiuk went on to earn a Master of Fine Arts degree at RMIT University in Melbourne, Australia in 1991.

Exhibitions
 1991 - TORSO, Hugo Gallery, Canberra
 1996 - WORKS on PAPER, George Gallery, Melbourne
 1999 - MILLENNIUM COLLECTION, Adam Galleries, Melbourne
 2001 - OCEAN GALLERY inaugurated from Australian Shores
 2005 - SCULPTURE and GRAVERRE, Adam galleries, Melbourne
 2006 - IX International Glass Symposium,
 Curator: Prof. Sylva Petrova, PhD., MA, BA, Novy Bor, Czech Republic   
 2006 - Ranamok Glass Award, touring exhibition, Australia
 Works on Paper 2, NS, Nova sin gallery, Prague, Czech Republic
 2007 - Czech and Slovak Glass in Exile, Regional Moravian Gallery, Brno, Czech Republic

Awards
 1981, 1990 - Honorary Award, Dante's Biennale, Ravenna, Italy
 1999 - One of six artists selected for the annual Print Commission, Print Council of Australia
 2006 - Ranamok Glass Prize, finalist
 2018 - Mildura Print Triennial finalist
 2020 - VAS SCULPTURE AWARD CONTEMPORARY EXHIBITION winner

Personal life
Zbych Trofimiuk, an Australian actor, is her son.

References

External links 
SELECTED WORKS OF ART

1952 births
Living people
20th-century Australian sculptors
RMIT University alumni
Artists from Prague
Australian artisans
Australian glass artists
Women glass artists
Australian people of Czech descent
Czechoslovak emigrants to Australia
Glass makers
21st-century Australian sculptors
Artists from Melbourne
Print Council of Australia
Australian women sculptors
20th-century Australian women artists
21st-century Australian women artists